Mad Scientist Toon Club (aka Mad Scientist Kids Club) is an educational children's television show produced by Saban Entertainment that aired in US syndication from September 15, 1993 to January 25, 1994.

Each hour-long program mixed live action segments hosted by the scientist character "Dr. π" and pre-existing Japanese animation, including Saban's Tic Tac Toons. Dr. Pi wore a green lab coat and a backwards baseball cap, surrounded by a colorful set, and presented experiments that children could perform at home. The format of the science portions was similar to Beakman's World and Bill Nye the Science Guy; all three were produced in response to the 1990 Children's Television Act, which mandated each broadcaster to air a minimum amount of educational programming.

Episodes
This Mad Scientist Toon Club episode list was compiled from US Copyright Office listings. The episodes that aired on the same date were given a combined entry in the registry.

References

 http://www.faqs.org/copyright/dex-at-bat-invasion-of-leawood-exit-nefaria-enter-barbaria-2/#id11534764
 "Slick and Fast, Science Shows Emulate MTV"
 United States Copyright Office - Public Catalog Search (episode 1 is registration number PA0000735342 and ep. 20 is PA0000735582)

1990s American children's television series
1990s American science fiction television series
1993 American television series debuts
1994 American television series endings
American children's education television series
American television series with live action and animation
English-language television shows
First-run syndicated television programs in the United States
Science education television series
Television series by Saban Entertainment